Krishnanagar Lok Sabha constituency (occasionally referred as Krishnagar) is one of the 42 Lok Sabha (parliamentary) constituencies in West Bengal state in eastern India. All the seven assembly segments of No. 12 Krishnanagar Lok Sabha constituency are in Nadia district.

Vidhan Sabha segments

As per order of the Delimitation Commission in respect of the delimitation of parliamentary constituencies in West Bengal, parliamentary constituency no. 12 Krishnanagar comprises the following segments from 2009:

In 2004, Krishnagar Lok Sabha constituency was composed of the following assembly segments:Palashipara (assembly constituency no. 70), Nakshipara (assembly constituency no. 71), Kaliganj (assembly constituency no. 72), Chapra (assembly constituency no. 73), Krishnaganj (SC) (assembly constituency no. 74), Krishnanagar East (assembly constituency no. 75), Krishnanagar West (assembly constituency no. 76)

Members of Lok Sabha

Election results

17th Lok Sabha: 2019 General Elections

General elections 2014

General election 2009

General elections 1967-2004
Most of the contests were multi-cornered. However, only winners and runners-up are mentioned below:

References

See also
 Krishnagar
 List of Constituencies of the Lok Sabha

Lok Sabha constituencies in West Bengal
Politics of Nadia district
Krishnanagar